Seven Mile Ford is a census-designated place (CDP) in Smyth County, Virginia, United States. The population as of the 2010 Census was 783. It obtained its current name as a result of being a river crossing seven miles from the Royal Oak Fort in Marion, Virginia.

Aspenvale Cemetery was listed on the National Register of Historic Places in 1980.

References

External links
The History of Seven Mile Ford, Virginia

Unincorporated communities in Smyth County, Virginia
U.S. Route 11
Unincorporated communities in Virginia